"Parle à ma main" (French for "Talk to the hand") is a 2006 song recorded by French act Fatal Bazooka featuring Yelle. It was the fifth and last single from the album T'as vu, and was released in November 2007. It was particularly successful in France and Belgium (Wallonia), where it was a number one hit for many weeks.

Music video
In the music video, David Guetta's hit single "Love Is Gone" can be heard at the beginning and is sung by Fatal Bazooka (portrayed by Michaël Youn). French actor Vincent Desagnat features in the video, while French singers Vitaa and Diam's are mentioned in the lyrics. A sequence in a gymnasium is inspired by the music video for Gwen Stefani's "Hollaback Girl," particularly in the featuring of a brass band and some majorettes.

Chart performance
In France, the single entered the singles chart at number two on 1 December 2007, then climbed to number one and stayed there for seven weeks. Then after three weeks at number two, it dropped quickly. It totaled 13 weeks in the top ten, 16 weeks in the top 50 and 19 weeks on the chart (top 100).

In Belgium (Wallonia), "Parle à ma main" charted for 22 weeks in the top 40 from 15 December 2007. It started at number 24, reached the top ten two weeks later, and eventually topped the chart for four weeks. It remained in the top ten for 16 weeks .

It achieved a moderate success in Switzerland. It charted for 17 weeks, with a peak at number 31 in its third week, on 9 December 2007.

Awards
In 2008, the song won a NRJ Music Awards for the category "Music video of the year".

Track listings
 CD single
 "Parle à ma main" — 3:40
 "Auto-Clash" by Fatal Bazooka — 4:53

 Digital download
 "Parle à ma main" — 3:40

Charts

Weekly charts

Year-end charts

Certifications

See also
List of number-one hits of 2007 (France)
Ultratop 40 number-one hits of 2008

References

2006 songs
2007 singles
French hip hop songs
Michaël Youn songs
Ultratop 50 Singles (Wallonia) number-one singles
SNEP Top Singles number-one singles
Male–female vocal duets
Yelle songs